Gajanur (pronounced: Gaajanoor) is a village in Thalavadi taluk, Erode district of Tamil Nadu, India. It is also known as Dodda Gajanur. Most of roads are connected to Karnataka state.

Gajanur is the birthplace of Kannada matinee idol Dr. Rajkumar, who was kidnapped by Veerappan from his native house in Gajanur on 30 July 2000. The village abuts the Sathyamangalam Wildlife Sanctuary.

References

Internal borders of India
Villages in Erode district